Qarabagh or Qara Bagh, is a district in Ghazni province, 56 km to the south-west of Ghazni city in eastern Afghanistan. The 1,800 km2 area is one of the most populated at 109,000; some reports count more than 218,000.  The ethnic composition of the district includes Hazaras and Pashtuns.
The landscape varies in different parts of the district - deserts in the southwest, plains in the southeast and mountains in the north. The district is seriously affected by drought, especially farming and animal husbandry. Health and education need serious improvement.

Taliban militiamen are active in the area. Their threats have forced the girls' schools in the district to close. They briefly seized the government headquarters at the district centre in the town of Qarabagh in April 2007. The Taliban also seized the Giro district centre southeast of Qarabagh. In July 2007, the Taliban kidnapped 23 Korean aid workers as their bus was hijacked passing through the district on the road between Kabul and Kandahar.

Politics and Governance 
The district chief was replaced in 2006 by Zabit Salih Gul after the previous incumbent quit due to frequent threats by the Taliban.

On 22 November 2009 one militant was shot dead in Ali Naizi village in Qarabagh district after an operation by ISAF forces.

Geography 
Parts of the inhabited regions of the district are located in the Qolyaqol valley.

Healthcare

Education

Demographics
The two main Hazara groups in the district are Muhammad Khwaja, who tend to live in the center and north of the district, and Chahar-Dasta, who tend to live in the west.

Economy
The area is poor and traditionally one of out-migration to Kabul, Ghazni, Lashkar Gah, and Quetta, as well as to other countries.

The most of the population are depended on agricultural resources.

The economy is largely based on the remittances of the men who work out of the region. Agriculture is mostly based on irrigation, but production is low. Autumn wheat dominates, but spring wheat, barley, potatoes, beans, onions, carrots, turnips and fodder plants are also cultivated. Other crops like almonds, mulberries, apricots, apples and grape may be found in some areas.

Infrastructure

Natural Resources

See also 
 Districts of Afghanistan
 Hazarajat
 Qara Baghi (Hazara tribe)

References 

 https://web.archive.org/web/20070927204933/http://www.pajhwok.com/viewstory.asp?id=29703
 http://asia.news.yahoo.com/070418/3/30hxp.html
 https://web.archive.org/web/20070817065921/http://www.cnn.com/2007/WORLD/asiapcf/07/20/afghanistan.kidnap.reut/index.html#cnnSTCText?

External links
 Map of Settlements AIMS, 2002
 Qarabagh District, Ghazni Province (Gazni Province), Afghanistan MinDat.org (mineral data)

Hazarajat
Districts of Ghazni Province